Tori Jankoska (born September 16, 1994) is an American professional women's basketball player.  She was drafted with the ninth overall pick in the 2017 WNBA Draft by the Chicago Sky. In May 2017, Jankoska was waived by the Sky after the team's season opener. In June 2017 Jankoska signed to play for the Polish team Basket Gdynia for the 2017–2018 season.

Jankoska is Michigan State's all-time leader in points scored, three point shots made, field goals made and second all time in assists.

Michigan State statistics
Source

References

1994 births
Living people
American women's basketball players
Basketball players from Michigan
Chicago Sky draft picks
Guards (basketball)
Michigan State Spartans women's basketball players
Parade High School All-Americans (girls' basketball)
Sportspeople from Saginaw, Michigan